In the small island state of Malta, the church or chapel is a common feature of the landscape. Many churches in Malta dominate the skyline, and the domes and steeples can usually be seen from across the island. One can usually find the centre of a town or village by driving towards the parish church, although many towns and village cores feature two or more churches and chapels.

On the islands of Malta and Gozo, which are two separate dioceses, there are a total of 359 churches (313 in Malta and 46 in Gozo). Of these, 78 are parishes (63 in Malta and 15 in Gozo) and six are national parishes.
This means that there is a "church density" of slightly more than one church per square kilometer. In Malta, every locality has its parish church, apart from two or three small localities. There are also localities that have more than one parish church, like Sliema and Birkirkara, which have four parishes each. The list below lists most of the churches in Malta, Gozo and Comino, starting from the cathedrals, minor basilicas, parish churches and churches/chapels.

List of cathedrals, basilicas, parish churches and other churches and chapels in Malta and Gozo

References

External links

 http://www.malta-canada.com/churches-chapels/index-Chap.htm
 Quddies.com.mt
 BrideMalta.com's section about churches in Malta with addresses, hours of office, mass times, contact details
 List of Churches in Malta providing funeral Services by Camilleri Funeral Directors Malta.

 
Malta
Churches